Redfearn Island is a small island in the Donskiye Islands group lying just west of Warriner Island and 1 nautical mile (1.9 km) off the west end of Breidnes Peninsula, Vestfold Hills. First plotted as two small islands by Norwegian cartographers working from air photos taken by the Lars Christensen Expedition, 1936–37. Replotted as a single island from ANARE (Australian National Antarctic Research Expeditions) air photos of 1957–58. Named by Antarctic Names Committee of Australia (ANCA) for H.T. Redfearn, diesel mechanic at Davis Station, 1961.

See also 
 List of Antarctic and Subantarctic islands

Islands of Princess Elizabeth Land